Citi Zēni is a Latvian pop band, currently consisting of six members. They represented Latvia in the Eurovision Song Contest 2022 with their single “Eat Your Salad”.

History 
Citi Zēni formed in March 2020 at a songwriting camp outside of Riga.

In 2021, the band released their debut album Suņi Iziet Ielās, which translates to Dogs Take To The Streets in English.

In 2022, the band announced their bid for Supernova 2022, with the release of their new single "Eat Your Salad". The band qualified for the final and went on to win it on 12 February 2022. As a result, they represented Latvia in the Eurovision Song Contest 2022 and failed to qualify for the grand final.

Band members

Jānis Pētersons – vocals
Dagnis Roziņš – vocals, saxophone
Reinis Višķeris – keyboards
Krišjānis Ozols – guitar
Roberts Memmēns – bass, vocals
Toms Kagainis – drums

Discography

Studio albums
Suņi Iziet Ielās (2021)

Singles
"Vienmēr Kavēju" (2020)
"Parādi Kas Tas Ir" (2020)
"Suņi Iziet Ielās" (2021)
"Skaistās Kājas" (2021)
"Limuzīns Uz Krīta" (2021)
"Eat Your Salad" (2022)
"Lieka Štuka" (2022)

References

External links 
 

Latvian musical groups
Musical groups established in 2020
2020 establishments in Latvia
Eurovision Song Contest entrants for Latvia
Eurovision Song Contest entrants of 2022